The People's Movement of Serbia ( was a Serbian political party that existed from 2015 to 2017. Its leader was Miroslav Aleksić, who was also its only member in the National Assembly of Serbia. In October 2017, Aleksić allowed the party to be re-registered as the People's Party under the leadership of Vuk Jeremić.

Origins
Miroslav Aleksić became mayor of Trstenik in 2012 as a member of the United Regions of Serbia (Ujedinjeni regioni Srbije, URS). The URS largely became dormant after the 2014 Serbian parliamentary election, and Aleksić left the party later in the year and became acting leader of a breakaway group initially called the People's Party of Serbia (Narodna stranka Srbije, NSS). The group was formally constituted as the People's Movement of Serbia in January 2015, and Aleksić was chosen as its leader in February.

Electoral results
The party contested the 2016 parliamentary election as part of the Alliance for a Better Serbia list led by Boris Tadić, Čedomir Jovanović and Nenad Čanak. Aleksić received the eighth position on the electoral list and was elected when the alliance won thirteen mandates.

The People's Movement of Serbia operated in a parliamentary alliance with Tadić's  Social Democratic Party, which also contested the 2016 elections in the Alliance for a Better Serbia. Aleksić served as the parliamentary group's deputy leader. Both the alliance with the Social Democratic Party and Aleksić's deputy leadership of the parliamentary group continued after the party was restructured as the People's Party.

References

2015 establishments in Serbia
2017 disestablishments in Serbia
Conservative parties in Serbia
Defunct conservative parties
Defunct political parties in Serbia
Political parties disestablished in 2017
Political parties established in 2015
Pro-European political parties in Serbia
Regionalist parties